Sanquhar in Dumfriesshire was a royal burgh that returned one commissioner to the Parliament of Scotland and to the Convention of Estates.

After the Acts of Union 1707, Sanquhar, Annan, Dumfries, Kirkcudbright and Lochmaben formed the Dumfries district of burghs, returning one member between them to the House of Commons of Great Britain.

List of burgh commissioners

 1661–62, 1665 convention, 1667 convention, 1669–72, 1678 convention), 1681–82: Robert Carmichael of Corp, provost
 1685–86: John Carmichell, provost 
 1689 (convention), 1689–1690: John Boswall (died c.1690)
 1693–1702: Sir Alexander Bruce of Broomhall (expelled 1702)
 1702, 1702–07: William Alves, commissar of Dumfries

See also
 List of constituencies in the Parliament of Scotland at the time of the Union

References

Constituencies of the Parliament of Scotland (to 1707)
Constituencies disestablished in 1707
1707 disestablishments in Scotland
History of Dumfries and Galloway
Politics of Dumfries and Galloway
Sanquhar